Jessica Moore and Jocelyn Rae were the defending champions, however Rae retired from professional tennis in December 2017, while Moore decided not to participate.

Desirae Krawczyk and Giuliana Olmos won the title, defeating Kateryna Kozlova and Arantxa Rus in the final, 6–2, 7–5.

Seeds

Draw

Draw

References
Main Draw

Odlum Brown Vancouver Open - Doubles
Vancouver Open